Morro d'Alba is a comune (municipality) in the Province of Ancona in the Italian region Marche, located about  west of Ancona.

Morro d'Alba borders the following municipalities: Belvedere Ostrense, Monte San Vito, San Marcello, Senigallia.

References

Cities and towns in the Marche